Spring Breakin' was a professional wrestling event produced by WWE. It was held primarily for wrestlers from the NXT brand division. Spring Breakin' aired as a special episode of NXT 2.0. The television special took place on May 3, 2022, at the WWE Performance Center in Orlando, Florida and aired on the USA Network.

Five matches were contested at the event. In the main event, Bron Breakker defeated Joe Gacy to retain the NXT Championship.

Production

Background
On the April 19, 2022, episode of NXT 2.0, it was announced that Spring Breakin' would be held as a special episode of NXT 2.0, with the television special airing on May 3 on the USA Network and taking place at NXT's home base of the WWE Performance Center in Orlando, Florida.

Storylines 
The card consisted of matches that resulted from scripted storylines, where wrestlers portrayed villains, heroes, or less distinguishable characters in scripted events that built tension and culminated in a wrestling match or series of matches. Results were predetermined by WWE's writers on the NXT brand, while storylines were played out on NXT's weekly television program NXT 2.0 and the supplementary online streaming show Level Up.

On the April 5 episode of NXT, following Bron Breakker's successful NXT Championship defense, Joe Gacy appeared on the Tron and kidnapped Breakker's father, Rick Steiner. The following week, Gacy burned Steiner's WWE Hall of Fame ring. Breakker spent the entirety of the April 19 episode of NXT searching for Gacy. At the end of the show, Breakker found Gacy on top of the concourse. Breakker got his father's Hall of Fame ring back under one condition: Breakker had to defend the NXT Championship against Gacy at Spring Breakin'. Afterwards, Gacy said, "You need to take a leap of faith" before pushing Breakker off the concourse. Breakker was surrounded by Gacy's druids as NXT went off the air.

At NXT Stand & Deliver, Carmelo Hayes lost the NXT North American Championship to Cameron Grimes in a five-way ladder match. On the April 12 episode of NXT, after Grimes retained the title against Solo Sikoa, he was attacked by Hayes and Trick Williams. The following week, after Hayes' match, Hayes stated that he will be taking the NXT North American Championship back from Grimes at Spring Breakin'. As Grimes and Hayes stared each other down, Sikoa appeared and attacked Hayes and Williams. Later that night, a triple threat match between the three for the title was scheduled for Spring Breakin'.

On the April 12 episode of NXT, Natalya made her return to NXT to seemingly wish a good future for Cora Jade, only to tell her that the future was bleak. She then placed Jade in the sharpshooter and stood tall. On the April 26 episode, after Nikkita Lyons defeated Lash Legend, Natalya and Legend attacked Lyons until Jade made the save. Later that night, a tag team match pitting Lyons and Jade against Natalya and Legend was scheduled for Spring Breakin'.

On the April 12 episode of NXT, The Creed Brothers (Brutus Creed and Julius Creed) eliminated three teams, but were the last team eliminated in a gauntlet match for the vacant NXT Tag Team Championship. On the April 26 episode, Roderick Strong hyped The Creed Brothers to reverse their fortunes and booked them in a match against SmackDown's The Viking Raiders (Erik and Ivar) at Spring Breakin'.

On the April 26 episode of NXT, Nathan Frazer was scheduled to face Guru Raaj in the former's debut match, only for Grayson Waller to attack Raaj. Waller then mocked Frazer before turning his attention to the Chase University students in attendance. Frazer then laid out Waller, with Chase U member Andre Chase calling it a "teachable moment". Later that night, Frazer was scheduled to face Waller at Spring Breakin'.

On the April 19 episode of NXT, two hooded men cost Santos Escobar a win. The following week, the men fought with Legado Del Fantasma (Joaquin Wilde and Cruz Del Toro) during Tony D'Angelo's match, allowing Escobar to attack D'Angelo on the outside of the ring, causing him to lose his match. Later that night, the hooded men were revealed to be Channing "Stacks" Lorenzo and Troy "Two Dimes" Donovan. Also, it was announced that D'Angelo and Escobar would have a sit-down meeting at Spring Breakin'.

Aftermath
On the following episode of NXT, Joe Gacy offered Bron Breakker an invitation to join his movement. The following week, Breakker declined. Gacy then offered Breakker a rematch for the title, adding the stipulation that Breakker would lose the championship if he was disqualified due to him not being able to control his anger. The match was scheduled for In Your House.

Also on NXT, Solo Sikoa wanted another shot at the NXT North American Championship, and defending champion Cameron Grimes said that he will get the match after Grimes defeats Carmelo Hayes at In Your House. The next day, a match between Grimes and Hayes for the title was made official for In Your House.

On the May 17 episode of NXT, The Viking Raiders (Erik and Ivar) avenged their loss and defeated The Creed Brothers (Brutus Creed and Julius Creed) after interference from Roderick Strong and Damon Kemp.

Natalya and Cora Jade had a match on the following episode of NXT which Natalya won. Afterwards, Jade and Natalya showed each other respect.

Results

References

External links 
 

WWE NXT
2022 in professional wrestling in Florida
Events in Orlando, Florida
May 2022 events in the United States
Professional wrestling in Orlando, Florida